Richard Feldman (born June 15, 1969) is an American professional bicycle racer in time trialing, cyclocross and marathon mountain bike races.  He rides for the Durance-Colnago team .  In 2001, he was the first American to win the UCI world masters time trial championship, in St. Johann, Austria.

He has won eight more rainbow jerseys in 2003, 2004, 2005, 2010, 2011, 2012, 2013, and 2015.

Feldman owns and operates Durance and lives in Ketchum, Idaho. In 1998 and 1999, he won the Leadville Trail 100 Mountain bike race.  He has also won twelve national championships in cyclocross and time trial.

Career highlights

1989
 World Championship Long Team – Team Time Trial
1990
 1st Idaho State Time Trail Championship
1992
 1st Idaho State Time Trail Championship
 1st Utah State Time Trial Championship
 1st Mackay Triple Eight Challenge [NORBA Classic]
1993
 1st Utah State Time Trial Championship – Course Record
 World Championship Long Team – Team Time Trial
1994
 1st Idaho State Time Trial Championship
1995
 1st Idaho State Time Trial Championship
 1st Galena Grinder
1997
 1st Idaho-Utah State Time Trial Championship
1998
 1st Leadville Trail 100
 1st Idaho State Time Trial Championship – New State Record
1999
 1st Leadville Trail 100
 1st Idaho State Time Trial Championship
 1st  Overall Durance Time Trial Series
 1st Galena Grinder
2000
 1st Idaho State Time Trial Championship
 1st  Overall Durance Time Trial Series
2001
 1st  UCI World Master Time Trial Championship
 1st Deutschlandsberg Stage Race
 1st Idaho State Time Trial Championship
 1st  Overall Durance Time Trial Series
2002
 1st  National Cyclocross Championship – Master
 1st Idaho State Time Trial Championship
 1st  Overall Durance Time Trial Series
2003
 1st  UCI World Master Time Trial Championship
 1st  National Cyclocross Championship – Master
 1st Idaho State Time Trial Championship
 1st  Overall Durance Time Trial Series
 1st  Overall Snake River Omnium
2004
 1st UCI World Master Time Trial Championship
 1st National Time Trial Championship – Master
 1st National Cyclocross Championship – Master
 1st Idaho State Time Trial Championship
 1st US gran prix of cyclocross – Steilacoom
 1st Idaho State Cyclocross Championship
2005
 1st UCI World Master Time Trial Championship
 1st National Time Trial Championship – Master
 1st Idaho State Time Trial Championship
 1st Utah State Time Trial Championship
 1st Idaho State Cyclocross Championship
 1st US gran prix of cyclocross – Steilacoom
2006
 1st National Time Trial Championship – Master
 1st National Cyclocross Championship – Master
 1st Idaho State Time Trial Championship
 1st Utah State Time Trial Championship
 1st US gran prix of cyclocross – Glouchester #2
 1st W.E. Stedman GP of Cross #5
2007
 1st National Time Trial Championship – Master
 1st Idaho State Time Trial Championship
 1st  Overall US gran prix of cyclocross
1st US gran prix of cyclocross – Louisville #2
1st US gran prix of cyclocross – Trenton #1
1st US gran prix of cyclocross – Portland #1
2008
 1st  National Time Trial Championship – Master
 1st  Overall George’s Time Trial Stage Race
 1st US gran prix of cyclocross – West Windsor #1
 1st US gran prix of cyclocross – West Windsor #2
2009
 1st  Overall G-Fit Time Trial Festival
2010
 1st  UCI World Master Time Trial Championship
 1st  National Time Trial Championship – Master
 1st Idaho State Road Race
 1st  Overall George’s Spring Series
 1st  Overall G-Fit Time Trial Festival
 1st Utah State Time Trial Championship
 1st  Overall Targhee-Teton Hill Climbs
 1st  SWICA BAR
 1st  Eagle Island Cyclocross Series
 1st US gran prix of cyclocross – Portland #1
2011
 1st  UCI World Master Time Trial Championship
 1st Grand Fondo New York Road Race
 1st  Overall Idaho Time Trial Festival
 1st Utah State Time Trial Championship
 1st  Overall Targhee-Teton Hill Climbs
 1st Idaho State Road Race Championship
 1st Idaho State Time Trial Championship
 1st  SWICA BAR
 1st US gran prix of cyclocross – Madison #2
 1st  Overall Southern Idaho Cyclocross Series
 1st  Overall Eagle Island Cyclocross Series
 1st  Overall US gran prix of cyclocross
2012
 1st  UCI World Master Time Trial Championship
 1st  National Time Trial Championship – Master
 1st Emmett-Roubaix Road Race
 1st  Overall Idaho Time Trial Festival
 1st Town to Summit Hill Climb
 1st Idaho State Time Trial Championship
2013
 1st  UCI World Master Time Trial Championship
 1st  National Time Trial Championship – Master
 1st Idaho State Road Race Championship
 1st Idaho State Time Trial Championship
 1st Utah State Time Trial Championship
 1st  Overall Southern Idaho Cyclocross Series
 1st Baldy Hill Climb
2014
 1st Utah State Time Trial Championship
 1st Grand Targhee Hill Climb
 1st Idaho State Time Trial Championship
2015
 1st  UCI World Master Time Trial Championship
 1st Emmett-Roubaix Road Race / Idaho State Road Race Championship
 1st Idaho State Time Trial Championship
 1st Golfe de Ste Tropez Grand Fondo
 1st Utah State Time Trial Championship
 1st Baldy Hill Climb - Course Record
2016
 1st Emmett-Roubaix Road Race / Idaho State Road Race Championship
 1st Idaho State Time Trial Championship
 1st Utah State Time Trial Championship
2017
 1st Idaho State Road Race Championship
 1st Albi CLM
 1st Idaho State Time Trial Championship
2018
 1st Idaho State Time Trial Championship
2019
 1st Idaho State Time Trial Championship

References

American male cyclists
Marathon mountain bikers
1969 births
Living people
People from Ketchum, Idaho